Viscount  was a Japanese businessman, central banker, philanthropist and folklorist.  He was the 16th Governor of the Bank of Japan (BOJ).

Early life
Shibusawa was born in Tokyo.  He was the grandson of Shibusawa Eiichi.

Career
Shibusawa was Governor of the Bank of Japan from March 18, 1944 – October 9, 1945.  He left the bank to serve as Finance Minister in the brief post-war government of Kijūrō Shidehara in 1945-1946.

The dissolution of the Japanese zaibatsu was implemented during the period in which he was head of the Ministry of Finance.

Shibusawa was involved in the creation of the core collection of the National Museum of Ethnology in Osaka.

See also
 Shibusawa Eiichi

Notes

References
 Tamaki, Norio. (1995). Japanese Banking: a History, 1859-1959. Cambridge: Cambridge University Press. ;  OCLC 231677071
Werner, Richard A. (2003). Princes of the Yen: Japan's Central Bankers and the Transformation of the Economy. Armonk, New York: M.E. Sharpe. ;  OCLC 471605161

1896 births
1963 deaths
Ministers of Finance of Japan
Governors of the Bank of Japan